The 2018 AMA Motocross Championship season is the 46th AMA Motocross National Championship season, the premier motocross series in USA. Eli Tomac goes into the season as the defending champion in the 450 class, after taking his first 450 national title in 2017. This was Tomac's second AMA motocross title, after taking the 250 class in 2013. In the 250 class Zach Osborne is the defending champion after taking his maiden title last season.

Calendar and Results

450cc

250cc

450cc

Entry List

Riders Championship
{|
|

250cc

Entry List

Riders Championship
{|
|

References 

AMA Motocross Championship
2018 in motorcycle sport